= Swahili Times =

Tanzanian online newspaper

SwahiliTimes
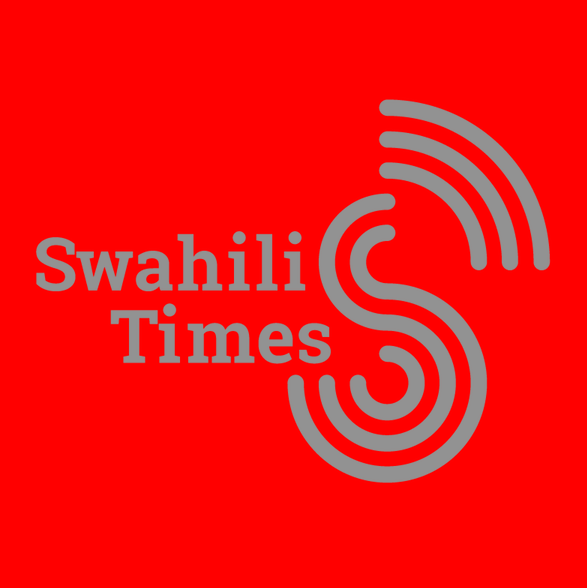
- Logo of Swahili Times
- Website type: Online Newspaper
- Available in: Swahili
- Founded: April 2, 2016; 10 years ago
- Country of origin: Tanzania
- Website: swahilitimes.co.tz
- Commercial: Yes
- Current status: Active

Swahili Times is a Tanzanian online news aggregator and blog that features mostly local and international news, both in Swahili. It was launched on April 2, 2016. The site offers news, satire, blogs, and covers politics, business, entertainment, environment, technology, popular media, lifestyle, culture, comedy, gossip, life around Tanzanian's new generation of movies and music lifestyle and local news, based in Dar es Salaam.
